Georges Dicker is an American philosopher, currently a SUNY Distinguished Professor at The College at Brockport, State University of New York.

References

Year of birth missing (living people)
Living people
State University of New York faculty
American philosophers